The 1985 Missouri Valley Conference men's basketball tournament was played after the conclusion of the 1984–1985 regular season. The quarterfinal and semifinal rounds were played on campus sites with the final contested at the Tulsa Convention Center in Tulsa, Oklahoma.

The Wichita State Shockers defeated the fifteenth ranked Tulsa Golden Hurricane in the championship game, 84-82, and as a result won their first MVC Tournament title to earn an automatic bid to the 1985 NCAA tournament.

Bracket

Note: * indicates host institution

References

1984–85 Missouri Valley Conference men's basketball season
Missouri Valley Conference men's basketball tournament
Missouri Valley Conference men's basketball tournament